Guy A. Sims is an American author known for the Brotherman series of comic books.  He is a frequent collaborator with his brother, the illustrator Dawud Anyabwile. In 2015, he adapted Walter Dean Myers' book Monster into a graphic novel which Anyabwile illustrated.

In 2017 the brothers worked together with Emory University to create the Big City Map Project which created a virtual reality (VR) world for the text of the Brotherman series. The Brotherman Comics and related memorabilia are archived at the National Museum of African American History & Culture.

Personal life
Sims was born in Philadelphia to Edward Sims Jr., a sociology professor and Deanna Jones-Sims, a public school teacher. He lives in Blacksburg, Virginia, with his wife and three kids.

References

External links
 Personal website 
 Big City Map Project

American comics artists
Living people
Artists from Philadelphia
African-American artists
Year of birth missing (living people)
21st-century African-American people